Anisophyllea is a genus of plant in the family Anisophylleaceae. The generic name is from the Greek meaning "unequal leaf", referring to the dimorphism of the leaves.

Description
Anisophyllea species grow as shrubs or trees. The bark is smooth to flaky. The flowers are unisexual. The fruits are drupes (pitted) and are ellipsoid or pear-shaped.

Distribution and habitat
Anisophyllea species are distributed widely throughout the old world tropics, including Africa, India, Sri Lanka, mainland Southeast Asia, Sumatra and Borneo. Their habitat is lowland and hill forests from sea-level to  altitude.

Species
 The Plant List recognises about 36 accepted species:

 Anisophyllea apetala  
 Anisophyllea beccariana  
 Anisophyllea boehmii  
 Anisophyllea buchneri  
 Anisophyllea buettneri  
 Anisophyllea cabole  
 Anisophyllea chartacea  
 Anisophyllea cinnamomoides  
 Anisophyllea corneri  
 Anisophyllea curtisii  
 Anisophyllea dichostila  
 Anisophyllea disticha  
 Anisophyllea fallax  
 Anisophyllea ferruginea  
 Anisophyllea glandulifolia  
 Anisophyllea globosa  
 Anisophyllea grandis  
 Anisophyllea griffithii  
 Anisophyllea guianensis  
 Anisophyllea impressinervia  
 Anisophyllea ismailii  
 Anisophyllea laurina  
 Anisophyllea manausensis  
 Anisophyllea meniaudii  
 Anisophyllea myriosticta  
 Anisophyllea nitida  
 Anisophyllea obtusifolia  
 Anisophyllea penninervata  
 Anisophyllea polyneura  
 Anisophyllea pomifera  
 Anisophyllea purpurascens  
 Anisophyllea quangensis  
 Anisophyllea reticulata  
 Anisophyllea rhomboidea  
 Anisophyllea scortechinii  
 Anisophyllea sororia  
 Anisophyllea thouarsiana

References

 
Cucurbitales genera
Taxonomy articles created by Polbot